Eva Hélène Linnéa Persson (born 9 December 1966) is a Swedish former competitive figure skater. She is a three-time Nordic champion and a five-time Swedish national champion. Her best result at an ISU Championship was 11th at the 1990 European Championships. Persson was selected to represent Sweden at the 1992 Winter Olympics in Albertville, France. She placed 24th in the short program and then withdrew.

Competitive highlights

References 

1966 births
Swedish female single skaters
Olympic figure skaters of Sweden
Living people
Sportspeople from Stockholm
Figure skaters at the 1992 Winter Olympics
20th-century Swedish women